Scotura intermedia is a moth of the family Notodontidae. It is found in Suriname, French Guiana, Guyana and Brazil.

References

Moths described in 1909
Notodontidae of South America